Woodland Grey is a 2021 Canadian independent horror film directed and co-written by Adam Reider, and starring Jenny Raven, Ryan Blakely, and Art Hindle.

Cast
 Jenny Raven as Emily
 Ryan Blakely as William
 Art Hindle as Moses

Release
Woodland Grey premiered at the Blood in the Snow Canadian Film Festival (BITS) on November 22, 2021. It screened at the Another Hole in the Head Film Festival in San Francisco, California, in December 2021. It is scheduled to screen at Cinema On The Bayou festival in Lafayette,Louisiana, in January 2022.

Reception
Dakota Dahl of Rue Morgue praised the film's music and the "unnatural on purpose" performances of Raven and Blakely, but referred to Hindle as "brutally under utilized". Dahl lamented the film as being "slow and weird for weirdness sake, in a way that is neither thoughtful nor rewarding"; comparing it unfavourably to surrealist films by David Lynch, Dahl wrote that, unlike Lynch's works, Woodland Grey "doesn't seem to have that original vision, instead opting to provide clues and red herrings that point to multiple conclusions, while really sticking the landing with none of them."

References

Further reading
 
Get Lost In The Tension-Filled Forest With Woodland Grey November 20, 2021. Retrieved Dec 1, 2021

External links
 

2021 horror films
2021 independent films
Canadian horror films
Canadian independent films
2020s English-language films
2020s Canadian films